James Augustine Murnaghan (19 April 1881 – 20 January 1973) was an Irish judge who served as a Judge of the Supreme Court from 1925 to 1953 and a Judge of the High Court from 1924 to 1925.

He attended University College Dublin and held the degrees of BA and LLD from the Royal University of Ireland. He also attended the King's Inns and was admitted to the degree of Barrister–at–Law in 1903.

He was Professor of Jurisprudence and Roman Law at UCD Law School from 1911 to 1924, where he also taught international law.

He was appointed as a Judge of the High Court in 1924. He served on the Supreme Court from 1925 to 1953.

He was the son of George Murnaghan, an Irish nationalist MP for Mid Tyrone, and was married to Alice Murnaghan.

In 1973, his widow Alice, established the James Murnaghan Memorial Prize at King's Inns.

He and his wife were avid collectors of paintings, silverware and porcelain. In December 1988, Alice Murnaghan's home was raided by a gang run by Martin Cahill. Items totalling £288,000 in value were stolen, about half were subsequently recovered.

References

External links
 

1881 births
1973 deaths
Irish barristers
Judges of the Supreme Court of Ireland
20th-century Irish lawyers
Alumni of University College Dublin
Alumni of the Royal University of Ireland
Members of the King's Inns
High Court judges (Ireland)
Academics of University College Dublin
Alumni of King's Inns